Depresija is an urban neighborhood of the city of Novi Sad, Serbia. Its name (meaning 'depression') is derived from the area's low physical elevation.

Location
Depresija is located in Sime Matavulja Street between Liman and Telep and is part of the "Ivo Andrić" local community.

Population
The population of the neighborhood consists of 150 people or 45 families, mostly of Romani origin.

See also
Neighborhoods of Novi Sad
Liman
List of Roma settlements

External links 

About Depresija (in Serbian)

Novi Sad neighborhoods
Romani communities in Serbia